The Committee on Regional Development (REGI) is a committee of the European Parliament. Its current chair, elected on 10 July 2019, is Younous Omarjee.

Research service 
The Committee is directly supported by a research service, the Policy Department for Structural & Cohesion Policies. Most of its research studies and briefings are published online. The publications do not necessarily reflect the view of the Committee.

Recent publications (as of October 2018):

Externalities of Cohesion Policy

Future links between structural reforms and EU cohesion policy

Conditionalities in Cohesion Policy

Digital Agenda and Cohesion Policy

The economic, social and territorial situation of Northern Ireland

Control and simplification of procedures within European Structural and Investment Funds (ESIF)

Economic, social and territorial situation of Slovenia

State Aid and Cohesion Policy

Implementation of Cohesion Policy in the 2014-2020 Programming Period – January 2018 UPDATE

Public Private Partnerships and Cohesion Policy

Cohesion policy and Paris Agreement Targets

Indicators in Cohesion Policy

Integrated use of ESI funds to address social challenges

European Cohesion Policy and regional development policies in other parts of the world

Lessons learnt from the Closure of the 2007-13 Programming Period

Financial instruments for energy efficiency and renewable energy

Gold-Plating in the European Structural and Investment Funds

The economic, social and territorial situation of Romania – North-West Region

References

External links
Official Homepage
Research for REGI Committee

Regional